Jack Ellis (born 24 October 2003) is an English professional footballer who plays as a defender for  club Carlisle United.

Career
Ellis turned professional at Carlisle United in January 2022, having already captained the under-18 team. Manager Keith Millen said that Ellis found youth football "too easy" as he had "developed very quickly in the last four months". He made EFL League Two debut for the club on 30 April 2022, in a 2–1 win over Stevenage at Brunton Park, in what was Carlisle's last home game of the 2021–22 season. Speaking in October 2022, new manager Paul Simpson said that Ellis had asked about leaving the club on loan, but had applied himself in training and performed well upon being returned to the starting eleven.

Style of play
Carlisle United manager said that Ellis is a player who provided "balance with his left foot, a desire to close people down [and] competed for headers".

Career statistics

References

2003 births
Living people
Sportspeople from Kendal
Footballers from Cumbria
English footballers
Association football defenders
English Football League players
Carlisle United F.C. players